opened in Sapporo, Hokkaidō, Japan in 2015. Located within Nopporo Shinrin Kōen Prefectural Natural Park, the permanent exhibition is dedicated to the nature, history, and culture of Hokkaido.

See also

 List of Cultural Properties of Japan - structures (Hokkaidō)
 List of Cultural Properties of Japan - historical materials (Hokkaidō)
 List of Historic Sites of Japan (Hokkaidō)
 Historical Village of Hokkaido
 Ainu culture

References

External links
  Hokkaido Museum
  Hokkaido Museum

Museums in Sapporo
History of Hokkaido
Tourist attractions in Sapporo
Museums established in 2015
2015 establishments in Japan